Joakim Nyström and Mats Wilander were the defending champions, but did not participate this year.

Scott Davis and Stefan Edberg won the title, defeating Anders Järryd and Danie Visser 7–6, 3–6, 6–3, 7–5 in the final.

Seeds
All seeds receive a bye into the second round.

Draw

Finals

Top half

Bottom half

References
Draw

U.S. Pro Indoor
1986 Grand Prix (tennis)